Edward Coyne was a rugby league footballer in the Australian competition the New South Wales Rugby League (NSWRL).

Coyne played for the Eastern Suburbs club in the 1916, 1918 and 1919 seasons.

References

The Encyclopedia of Rugby League; Alan Whiticker and Glen Hudson

Australian rugby league players
Sydney Roosters players
Year of birth missing
Year of death missing
Place of birth missing